Third Force may refer to:

Politics 
 Third party (politics), party other than one of the two dominant ones in a two-party political system
 Third party (United States), in American politics
 Third parties in a two-party system, in which two political parties dominate voting in nearly all elections at every level of government
 Chinese Peasants' and Workers' Democratic Party, called "Third party" in the 1930s
 Third Force, a term referring to Canadians of neither British or French descent; see 
 , attempts to establish another force against the authoritarian Kuomintang and the radical Chinese Communist Party during the Republic of China (1912-1949) era, and also attempts to establish an alternative to the Chinese-Communist-Party-lead People's Republic of China as well as the Kuomintang-lead Republic of China after the establishment of PRC and expulsion of KMT from Mainland China in 1949
 Third Force (France), a French political coalition during the Fourth Republic
 Third Force (Hong Kong), a political party in Hong Kong, supportive of China
 Third Force (Iran), a socialist–nationalist political movement in Iran during Abadan Crisis
 Third Force (Northern Ireland), a former Northern Irish paramilitary organisation
 Third Force (Myanmar), the informal name given to a collection of new political parties in Myanmar which contested the 2010 Burmese elections
 Third force (1996 Russian presidential election), an electoral coalition proposed during the 1996 Russian presidential election
 Third Force (South Africa), a late apartheid era militants, resistant to change
 Third Force (Ukraine), a Ukrainian political party

Music
 3rd Force, a smooth jazz band
 Third Force, a 1991 Jazz CD by American composer and saxophonist/multi-instrumentalist Thomas Chapin